"Rainbow to the Stars" is a 1996 song by German band Dune, released as the first single from their second album, Expedicion (1996). It is sung by Verena von Strenge and was a major hit in Europe, peaking at number seven in Finland, number eight in the Netherlands and number twelve in Germany. Additionally, the song reached number 23 in Switzerland and number 52 in Sweden.

Music video
A music video was produced to promote the single, directed by Eric Will.

Track listing
 CD single, Netherlands (1996)
"Rainbow to the Stars" (Video Mix) – 3:31
"Rainbow to the Stars" (12-Inch Mix) – 4:54

 CD maxi, Europe (1996)
"Rainbow to the Stars" (Video Mix) – 3:31
"Rainbow to the Stars" (Jimmy Miller Live Mix) – 6:28
"Rainbow to the Stars" (12-Inch Mix) – 4:54

Charts

Weekly charts

Year-end charts

References

 

1996 singles
1996 songs
Dune (band) songs
English-language German songs
Music videos directed by Eric Will
Songs written by Oliver Froning